Lake Alexander or Alexander Lake may refer to:

Lake Alexander (Northern Territory)
Lake Alexander (Alaska)
Alexander Lake (southcentral Alaska)
Lake Alexander (Minnesota)